Upper Deerfield Township is a township in Cumberland County, in the U.S. state of New Jersey. It is part of the Vineland-Bridgeton metropolitan statistical area for statistical purposes. As of the 2020 United States census, the township's population was 7,645, a decrease of 15 (−0.2%) from the 2010 census count of 7,660, which in turn reflected an increase of 104 (+1.4%) from the 7,556 counted in the 2000 census.

Upper Deerfield Township was incorporated as a township by an act of the New Jersey Legislature on February 23, 1922, from portions of Deerfield Township, based on the results of a referendum held on April 3, 1922. The township was named for Deerfield Township, which in turn was named for Deerfield, Massachusetts.

It is a dry town, where alcohol cannot be sold, as affirmed by a referendum passed in 1972. Upper Deerfield does not have its own police force and is protected by the New Jersey State Police.

Geography
According to the United States Census Bureau, the township had a total area of 31.39 square miles (81.31 km2), including 31.24 square miles (80.92 km2) of land and 0.15 square miles (0.39 km2) of water (0.48%).

Carlls Corner, Deerfield Street, Laurel Heights, Seabrook Farms (2010 population of 1,484), Seeley, Silver Lake, and Sunset Lake are unincorporated communities and census-designated places (CDPs) within Upper Deerfield Township.

Other unincorporated communities, localities and place names located partially or completely within the township include Beals Mills, Delaby, Finley, Friendship, Grammel Mills, Husted Station, Pleasant Grove, Seabrook, Seeley, Sunset, Watsons Corner and Woodruff.

The township borders Bridgeton, Deerfield Township, Fairfield Township and Hopewell Township in Cumberland County; and Alloway Township, Pittsgrove Township and Upper Pittsgrove Township in Salem County.

Demographics

2010 census

The Census Bureau's 2006–2010 American Community Survey showed that (in 2010 inflation-adjusted dollars) median household income was $53,646 (with a margin of error of +/− $6,771) and the median family income was $61,974 (+/− $9,964). Males had a median income of $45,532 (+/− $5,633) versus $36,741 (+/− $10,855) for females. The per capita income for the borough was $26,033 (+/− $2,581). About 8.9% of families and 12.4% of the population were below the poverty line, including 18.0% of those under age 18 and 4.8% of those age 65 or over.

2000 census
As of the 2000 United States census there were 7,556 people, 2,757 households, and 2,125 families residing in the township. The racial makeup of the township was 75.77% White, 16.41% African American, 0.81% Native American, 3.06% Asian, 0.01% Pacific Islander, 1.83% from other races, and 2.12% from two or more races. Hispanic or Latino of any race were 4.54% of the population.

There were 2,757 households, out of which 35.8% had children under the age of 18 living with them, 57.1% were married couples living together, 15.6% had a female householder with no husband present, and 22.9% were non-families. 20.0% of all households were made up of individuals, and 10.4% had someone living alone who was 65 years of age or older.  The average household size was 2.73 and the average family size was 3.12.

In the township the population was spread out, with 27.8% under the age of 18, 7.4% from 18 to 24, 25.5% from 25 to 44, 25.1% from 45 to 64, and 14.2% who were 65 years of age or older.  The median age was 38 years. For every 100 females, there were 94.1 males.  For every 100 females age 18 and over, there were 87.5 males.

The median income for a household in the township was $47,861, and the median income for a family was $51,472. Males had a median income of $37,064 versus $23,719 for females. The per capita income for the township was $18,884.  About 10.1% of families and 13.7% of the population were below the poverty line, including 23.2% of those under age 18 and 10.8% of those age 65 or over.

Parks and recreation
Sunset Lake is a reservoir located primarily in Hopewell Township and Upper Deerfield Township that was created by damming a stream that feeds to the area from Seeley Lake.

Government

Local government
Upper Deerfield Township is governed under the Township form of New Jersey municipal government, one of 141 municipalities (of the 564) statewide that use this form, the second-most commonly used form of government in the state. The governing body is comprised of the five-member Township Committee, whose members are elected at-large directly by the voters in partisan elections to serve three-year terms of office on a staggered basis, with either one or seats coming up for election each year as part of the November general election. At an annual reorganization meeting, the Township Committee selects one of its members to serve as Mayor and another as Deputy Mayor.

, members of the Upper Deerfield Township Committee are Mayor James P. Crilley (R, term on committee ends December 31, 2023; term as mayor ends 2022), Deputy Mayor John L. Daddario (R, term on committee and as deputy mayor ends 2022), Bruce T. Peterson (D, 2022), Scott R. Smith (R, 2024) and Thomas R. Speranza (R, 2024).

Federal, state and county representation 
Upper Deerfield Township is located in the 2nd Congressional District and is part of New Jersey's 3rd state legislative district.

Politics
As of March 2011, there were a total of 5,179 registered voters in Upper Deerfield Township, of which 1,296 (25.0%) were registered as Democrats, 1,189 (23.0%) were registered as Republicans and 2,693 (52.0%) were registered as Unaffiliated. There was one voter registered to another party.

In the 2012 presidential election, Republican Mitt Romney received 52.7% of the vote (1,839 cast), ahead of Democrat Barack Obama with 46.2% (1,614 votes), and other candidates with 1.1% (37 votes), among the 3,513 ballots cast by the township's 5,361 registered voters (23 ballots were spoiled), for a turnout of 65.5%. In the 2008 presidential election, Republican John McCain received 51.2% of the vote (1,864 cast), ahead of Democrat Barack Obama, who received 46.5% (1,694 votes), with 3,640 ballots cast among the township's 5,150 registered voters, for a turnout of 70.7%. In the 2004 presidential election, Republican George W. Bush received 54.5% of the vote (1,842 ballots cast), outpolling Democrat John Kerry, who received around 43.2% (1,460 votes), with 3,377 ballots cast among the township's 4,734 registered voters, for a turnout percentage of 71.3.

In the 2013 gubernatorial election, Republican Chris Christie received 66.0% of the vote (1,397 cast), ahead of Democrat Barbara Buono with 32.5% (687 votes), and other candidates with 1.6% (33 votes), among the 2,147 ballots cast by the township's 5,158 registered voters (30 ballots were spoiled), for a turnout of 41.6%. In the 2009 gubernatorial election, Republican Chris Christie received 50.3% of the vote (1,213 ballots cast), ahead of both Democrat Jon Corzine with 39.8% (959 votes) and Independent Chris Daggett with 7.0% (169 votes), with 2,411 ballots cast among the township's 5,064 registered voters, yielding a 47.6% turnout.

Education 
The Upper Deerfield Township Schools serve public school students in pre-kindergarten through eighth grade. As of the 2020–21 school year, the district, comprised of three schools, had an enrollment of 820 students and 83.2 classroom teachers (on an FTE basis), for a student–teacher ratio of 9.9:1. Schools in the district (with 2020–21 enrollment data from the National Center for Education Statistics) are 
Charles F. Seabrook School with 325 students in grades PreK-3), 
Elizabeth E. Moore School with 228 students in grades 4-5 and 
Woodruff School with 260 students in grades 6-8.

Public school students in ninth through twelfth grades attend Cumberland Regional High School, which also serves students from Deerfield Township, Fairfield Township, Greenwich Township, Hopewell Township, Shiloh Borough and Stow Creek Township. As of the 2020–21 school year, the high school had an enrollment of 1,032 students and 78.5 classroom teachers (on an FTE basis), for a student–teacher ratio of 13.1:1. The high school district has a nine-member board of education, with board seats allocated to the constituent municipalities based on population, with each municipality assigned a minimum of one seat; Upper Deerfield Township has two seats on the board.

Students are also eligible to attend Cumberland County Technology Education Center in Vineland, serving students from the entire county in its full-time technical training programs, which are offered without charge to students who are county residents.

Transportation

Roads and highways

Route 56 (Landis Avenue) branches off from Route 77 near the township's border with Bridgeton and heads northeast for  towards Pittsgrove Township.

Public transportation
NJ Transit offers service on the 410 route between Bridgeton and Philadelphia, and the 553 route between Upper Deerfield Township and Atlantic City.

Notable people

People who were born in, residents of, or otherwise closely associated with Upper Deerfield Township include:
 Charles F. Seabrook (1881–1964), business man and owner of Seabrook Farms, a family-owned frozen vegetable packing plant that at one point was the largest irrigated truck farm in the world, who was the namesake of Seabrook community and the Charles F. Seabrook School

Points of interest

 Deerfield Pike Tollgate House – added to the National Register of Historic Places in 1975, it was demolished in 2001. 
 Deerfield Presbyterian Church

References

External links

Upper Deerfield Township website
Upper Deerfield Township Schools

School Data for the Upper Deerfield Township Schools, National Center for Education Statistics
Cumberland Regional High School

 
1922 establishments in New Jersey
Populated places established in 1922
Township form of New Jersey government
Townships in Cumberland County, New Jersey